Sŏnch'ŏn station is a railway station in Sŏnch'ŏn-ŭp, Sŏnch'ŏn County, North P'yŏngan Province, North Korea. It is on located on the P'yŏngŭi Line of the Korean State Railway.

History
The station was opened, along with the rest of this section of the Kyŏngŭi Line, on 5 November 1905 by the Chosen Government Railway.

After the bridge across the Yalu River was opened on 1 November 1911, connecting Sinŭiju to Dandong, China, Sŏnch'ŏn station became a stop for international trains to and from Manchuria. It is still a stopping point for international trains between P'yŏngyang and Beijing.

On 27 December 1910, Korean independence activist An Myŏng-gŭn, cousin of An Chung-gŭn (who had assassinated Ito Hirobumi the previous year), attempted to assassinate the Japanese Governor-General of Korea, Terauchi Masatake, at Sŏnch'ŏn station; this was one of the precursors to the 105-Man Incident.

References

Railway stations in North Korea